Lungești may refer to several places in Romania:

 Lungești, a commune located in Vâlcea County
 Lungești, a village in Cozieni Commune, Buzău County
 Lungești, a village in Iara Commune, Cluj County
 Lungești, a village in Bălăbăneşti Commune, Galați County

See also
Lunga (disambiguation)